Gez may refer to:

People 
 Gez Varley, British musician
 Gez Walsh, English writer

Places 
 Gez, Bayburt, Turkey
 Gez, Hautes-Pyrénées, France

Other uses 
 Geʽez, a Semitic language native to Eritrea and Ethiopia
 , the former collecting agency of West Germany (and, later, Germany), 1976–2013
 Shelbyville Municipal Airport (Indiana)